Gabe Rosales (born 1978) is a professional musician, academic, sobriety advocate, international human rights activist, and criminal justice and drug policy reformist from California. He is predominantly known as a bassist, rapper, guitarist, singer, and producer. Rosales has worked in many genres of music, such as Rock, Pop, Drum and Bass, Fusion, Funk, Hip Hop, Latin music, and Death Metal. His album, Vital Nonsense, was released on February 10, 2009 as an introduction into his new life of sobriety detailing his memoirs on politics, religion, jail life, love and tragedy. Rosales has played with a variety of artists, including Jennifer Lopez, Fat Joe, Christina Milian, Andy Summers of The Police, Nicole Scherzinger, and George Lynch. Rosales earned a Bachelor of the Arts degree in Criminology, Law, and Society, from the University of California, Irvine in June 2017. His activism involves grassroots fundraising for humanitarian charities, Arts in Corrections facilitation, and collaborative efforts for prison abolition and drug legalization.

Biography

Early life
Born in 1978 in Southern California to Mexican parents, Rosales began studying music at age 5. Originally playing the piano, Gabe later switched to guitar and bass in his early teens. He was influenced early by groups such as Faith No More, N.W.A, and DJ Jazzy Jeff, as well as Mexican folk music his parents listened to and played. Rosales developed multiple artistic abilities at a young age, drawing under the instruction of his grandmother who was an artist in Laguna Beach, and also creative writing as he was inspired by his bedtime stories of Edgar Allan Poe. 
Rosales' parents divorced in 1986 when he was 8 and this split his family. His mother returned to school to complete a formal education which led Gabe to move to Northern California with his where his mother was eventually accepted to a Master's program at University of California, Santa Cruz., leaving his father in Southern California. His mother feared for his upbringing if he remained in Southern California as Gabe's father's alcoholism grew worse.
At age 13, Rosales developed a fascination with the occult, and bought books by Aleister Crowley and Anton La Vey. Rosales' predominant musical interest was death metal as he began performing with a band just 3 months after he picked up bass as a vocalist and instrumentalist. He utilized his dark Poe influenced poetry as the catalyst for his lyrics.

Teenage years
Eventually teenage angst conflict and his obsession with the occult wore on his mother and she sent him to move in with his father. During his first summer back in Southern California, Gabe practiced from 12 to 16 hours a day, and became interested in bands such as Weather Report, Bela Fleck and the Flecktones, Stevie Ray Vaughan, John Coltrane, Cameo, Zapp, and Art Tatum. During high school, Rosales performed in lead and supporting roles in many theater productions. He played in seven different bands, and displayed his art at a local art school. He stopped his occult practices, but continued to be subtly influenced by it in his drawings. A friendship began with music industry veteran producer and guitarist Paul Pesco, who introduced him to the Zen Guitar Book, sparking Rosales' interest with Quantum Physics and Eastern thought.

Professional career
In 1998 at the age of 19, Gabe recorded on his first professional album with George Lynch's Lynch Mob on the album ''Smoke This". A national tour followed where Gabe developed an increasingly dangerous alcohol problem. Once returning from the Lynch Mob tour in 2000 Rosales went on a spiritual search, and attended a 10-day Buddhist Vipassana meditation course. After his return from the course he began establishing himself in the Los Angeles music scene landing gigs with Christina Milian, Jennifer Lopez, Sheena Easton, Nicole Scherzinger and Prashant Aswani.

Gabe's substance abuse issues continued from 2001 - 2007 while his health deteriorated, and his personal life became turbulent once again. After spending months in county jail that ended with gang rioting and one of Southern California's longest lockdowns, Gabe finally reached his lowest point. He was forced to make a crucial decision in his life where he took a vow of sobriety in 2007. Resisting both drugs and alcohol he began a new journey as an activist, dedicated teacher, student and reformist. His jail experience drastically affected his views on the for-profit justice in the United States, the drug war and his personal relationships. This awakening inspired him to release his 1st solo album, Vital Nonsense (VNON), where he called upon many high-profile influential musicians and artists to contribute.

In 2009 Gabe became a member of the Universal Zulu Nation (UZN), the US West Coast general of the Anti Injustice Movement, a Guerrilla Republik soldier, a founding member of the science education secular artist collective Grand Unified. These affiliations involved him with national and global human rights issues and solutions. Gabe continued his community activism and service with the Zulu Union after the UZN splintered in 2016.

In early 2010 Gabe returned to school to receive a formal education focusing first on Anthropology then finally moving on to Criminology. He joined forces with another guitar hero, multi-Grammy Award-winning Andy Summers, the guitarist of the legendary band The Police, and recorded on various projects. At this time Gabe also joined the critically acclaimed entertainment company, Undercover, as first bass chair, background vocalist, and rapper. In 2012 Rosales recorded on fusion legend Prashant Aswani's album "Visions" teaming up with Jose PasillasII, from the award-winning rock band Incubus (band). By 2013 Gabe became affiliated with the American Indian Movement through the activist band Shadowtrain and he became an avid supporter of local community action groups such as the EZLN movement in Chiapas, Mexico. The same year he founded a secular sober community online called "Secular Sobriety Network," focusing on addressing addiction from an understanding of physiology, environmental factors, cultural trends and treatment through cognitive behavioral therapy.

From 2013 - 2017 Rosales' activism included academic, criminal justice, substance abuse counseling and drug policy reform pursuits. He co-founded the undergraduate chapter of Students for Sensible Drug Policy, worked as a Blum Center for Poverty Alleviation Ambassador and received a bachelor's degree in Criminology, Law and Society at the University of California, Irvine. He aligned himself with criminal justice organizations such as Just Leadership USA, and became a Center for Juvenile and Criminal Justice Next Generation fellow. He worked as a law clerk for Clemency Project 2014 where he petitioned for the release of non-violent low level drug offenders. He was involved in US State Department cultural exchange programs to stop impoverished North African youth from joining ISIS. He traveled to Uganda, Africa to aid impoverished communities through an organization called Love A Community, and he continued his grassroots fundraising with his activist musician band VNON raising money for children's charities such as Children of War Foundation, Children International, Court Appointed Special Advocates, and International Rescue Committee. In 2016 the Shadow Nation documentary, featuring the double album Gabe had recorded with Shadowtrain, was released to the public. The documentary featured Noam Chomsky, Tom Morello, and Serj Tankian, along with many other Native American academics, and activists.

In 2018, Gabe teamed up with Wayne Kramer (guitarist), the highly influential guitarist of the legendary band MC5, and became a lead artist at Kramer's Jail Guitar Doors nonprofit organization. Through Jail Guitar Doors he has facilitated musical expression as rehabilitation on Richard J. Donovan Correctional Facility's Echo and Alpha yard. This same year Rosales began contributing his knowledge to academics at UCI as a research assistant.

Vital Nonsense
Rosales' Vital Nonsense album consists of songs from many genres of music in which he is proficient. The album featured musicians such as Stephen Perkins from iconic rock band Jane's Addiction, Dave Weckl, Divine Styler, Paul Pesco, and Prashant Aswani. The album was produced by Pesco, Rosales, and Riz Story, and was recorded in various studios in the Orange County area. The album discusses political ideology, race, religion, jail life and redemption, and various aspects of Rosales's life.

Trivia
Rosales is endorsed by guitar company ESP Guitars.
He is a member of the international secular hip-hop activist movement, The Anti-Injustice Movement (aka The AIM).

References

“Gabe Rosales.” Gabe Rosales, VNON Productions, 18 Jan. 2009, www.gaberosales.com/.

External links
Lynch Mob at Discogs
Vital Nonsense on iTunes
Shadowtrain Album
Prashant Aswani - Visions
Guerrilla Republik- Love and Sacrifice Vol 10
Interview on raptalk.net
Interview on Guitarz Forever
Doublestop Podcast Interview

American rock guitarists
American male bass guitarists
American rappers of Mexican descent
West Coast hip hop musicians
Rappers from California
1978 births
Death metal musicians
Living people
21st-century American rappers
Guitarists from California
21st-century American bass guitarists
21st-century American male musicians
People from San Juan Capistrano, California